Balampur is a village in the Bhopal district of Madhya Pradesh, India. It is located in the Huzur tehsil and the Phanda block. Bhadbhadaghat is the nearest railway station.

Demographics 

According to the 2011 census of India, Balampur has 611 households. The effective literacy rate (i.e. the literacy rate of population excluding children aged 6 and below) is 65.3%.

References 

Villages in Huzur tehsil